The Right Hon. James Parker Smith of Jordanhill MP FRSE (1854–1929) was a Scottish barrister and politician who served as Liberal Unionist MP for Partick.  He was first elected at a by-election in 1890, but lost the seat in 1906. He was a Cambridge Apostle.

He had previously contested Greenock and Paisley.

Life

He was born on 30 August 1854 the son of Archibald Smith of Jordanhill (son of James Smith of Jordanhill) and his wife, Susan Emma Parker. Although his father was Scottish he was born in London and spent much of his life in England. He was educated at Winchester College. He then studied law at Cambridge University graduating MA. He qualified as a barrister in 1888.

From 1890 to 1906 his interests changed from law to politics. 
In January 1900, Smith was appointed assistant private secretary (unpaid) to Joseph Chamberlain, Secretary of State for the Colonies. He held this post until 1903.

In 1915 he returned to Winchester College as a fellow and as warden to the college. He later became a director of the Union Bank of Scotland. In 1921 he was elected a fellow of the Royal Society of Edinburgh. His proposers were Frederick Orpen Bower, Ralph Allan Sampson, Sir Edmund Taylor Whittaker and Sir James A. Ewing.

He died at the Brooks's Club in London on 30 April 1929.

Family

In 1882 he was married to Mary Louisa Hamilton. They were parents to Archibald Colin Hamilton Parker Smith, 5th laird of Jordanhill, and Wilmot Babington Parker Smith.

His brothers included Arthur Hamilton Smith, Henry Babington Smith, Lt Commander Charles Stewart Smith and Rev Walter Edward Smith.

Publications

Preferential Voting (1884)
The Causes of the Union with Ireland (1887)

References 

1854 births
1929 deaths
Members of the Parliament of the United Kingdom for Glasgow constituencies
UK MPs 1886–1892
UK MPs 1892–1895
UK MPs 1895–1900
UK MPs 1900–1906
Liberal Unionist Party MPs for Scottish constituencies
Members of the Privy Council of the United Kingdom